= BCUBE =

Italian multinational company

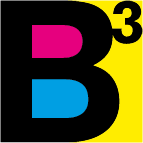
- Type: Private
- Industry: Integrated Logistics Services
- Founded: 1952
- Headquarters: Casale Monferrato, Italy
- Key people: Piero Carlo Bonzano, Chairman
- Products: Logistic Services
- Revenue: Euro 600 million (2019)
- Number of employees: 4,000 (2019)

BCUBE is a multinational company, operating in integrated logistics services for the supply chain management. It was founded in 1952 by the Bonzano family and is based in Casale Monferrato (Alessandria). BCUBE is present all over the world with more than 100 operational sites and over 4,000 employees.

== Sectors ==
The major sectors in which BCUBE operates are:

- automotive
- industrial
- energy
- oil & gas
- air cargo
- aerospace & defence
- consumer
- pharma
- transport

== History ==
The Group was founded in 1952 by Luigi Bonzano, operating initially in wood branch with raw material processing as its core activity. In a short time the range of services widened and the company started to offer itself as a supplier also in the field of wood packaging. Over the years, the company has steadily grown, expanding its working horizons to logistics, with a significant acceleration in the 1970s when Luigi's son, Piero Carlo, entered the company.

In the early 1980s, Piero Carlo Bonzano assumed the leadership of his division and transformed it into an independent company under the name of Argol. During the nineties Argol enhanced its business, particularly in the Energy Oil & Gas sector.

In 2000 the company opened the new logistics center, dedicated to the Energy branch, located in Guasticce (Livorno). From here on, Argol started focusing on new business areas and new services.

In 2012 the merger between the two Bonzano's family companies – Argol and Villanova – took place, bringing together different expertises. The new Gruppo Argol Villanova reality, based in Casale Monferrato, was born.

In 2014, Oliviero Toscani restyled the company's image. From this operation came the change of name in BCUBE and the new logo - with a large B (like the first letter of the Bonzano family), the use of CMYK and“3” used as an exponent.

== The Bonzano family ==
The Group is strictly connected to the Bonzano family, who founded it in 1952.

=== Piero Carlo Bonzano ===
Cavaliere del Lavoro since 2013, Piero Carlo Bonzano is the actual President and CEO of the BCUBE group.

Born in Casale Monferrato (AL) on November 14, 1952, he attended the faculty of Economics and Business of the University of Turin, where he graduated in 1977. He has two children, Luigi and Umberto Bonzano, employed inside the Group. He started his career when he was young in his family's company, I.B.L., which did business in the wood industry. There he dealt with the marketing area. After a few years, in 1983, he undertook the responsibility of Packaging Department as sole director of the company ARGOL, of which he expanded the activities by acquiring new clients and setting up new companies active in packaging, transports, shipments, and logistics. In parallel with acquisitions, Piero Carlo Bonzano developed activities in the industrial and integrated logistics fields with the acquisition of international clients, by giving the go-ahead to the construction of new logistic centres and the setting-up of new companies both in Italy and abroad. As part of this expansion and diversification process, as of 2000 he started acquiring Cargo Merci Fiumicino Srl (2007) and taking over the majority of Malpensa Logistica Europa SpA from SEA spa, in order to manage goods traffic of both Milan airports (Malpensa and Linate). In so doing, the Group has established itself as one of greatest operators in airport cargo handling by becoming the first Italian logistic operator.

In 2012, he reached an economic turning point by merging the two family companies active in the integrated logistics field, Argol SpA (of which he was already a majority shareholder) and Villanova SpA (specialised in the automotive industry), by giving rise to BCUBE group and by becoming its majority shareholder. It is a unique reality with a turnover greater than 700 million Euro, 6,500 employees and over 120 operating sites worldwide. Piero Carlo Bonzano has received several acknowledgements and awards, including “Il Logistico dell’Anno 2012” from Assologistica and the Prize “L’imprenditore dell’anno 2012” from the Chamber of Commerce of Alessandria. In 2013, he obtained the most prestigious award - the appointment for his service to industry as Cavaliere del Lavoro from the President of the Italian Republic, Giorgio Napolitano, in the Industrial Logistics field.

== International presence ==
BCUBE is present with over 100 operational sites in Italy and on major foreign markets.

== Corporate governance ==
President: Piero Carlo Bonzano

CEO: Luigi Bonzano
